Monilea carmesina is a species of small sea snail, a marine gastropod mollusc in the family Trochidae, the top snails.

References

 Powell A. W. B., New Zealand Mollusca, William Collins Publishers Ltd, Auckland, New Zealand 1979 

carmesina
Gastropods of New Zealand
Gastropods described in 1908